Dominique Barrière (c.1622–1678) was a French painter and engraver.

Life
Barrière was born at Marseilles in about 1622. He spent most of his career in  Rome, where he engraved a considerable number of plates, after Claude and other landscape painters, as well as other subjects. They are neatly etched in the manner of Stefano della Bella. He died in Rome in 1678. He sometimes signed his plates with his name, Dominicus Barriere Massiliensis, and sometimes with the cipher which is the mark used by Domenico del Barbiere, and thus mistakes frequently arise, although their styles are extremely different.

Works

His works include:
Portrait of Jean de la Valette; marked D. B.; scarce
A set of six landscapes
A set of 12 landscapes, dedicated to Lelio Orsini, 1651
Seven Views of the Villa Aldobrandini, 1649
A landscape, with the Zodiac, inscribed Vim profert ubi, etc.
A view of Frascati
Fontana maggiore nel Giardino di Tivoli, with his cipher
Eighty-four views and statues of the Villa Pamphili.
Four, entitled Catafalco e apparato nella ehiesa, etc.
Sepulchral Monument of N. L. Plumbini, Dominicus Barriere Gallus, in. ex. del. et scul.
Hercules, after a basso-rilievo in the Medicean Garden
A large plate; entitled Circum Urbis Agonalibus, etc. with many figures, 1650
Several plates of the History of Apollo, after the pictures by Domenichino and Viola

References

Sources
 

1620s births
1678 deaths
Artists from Marseille
17th-century French engravers
17th-century French painters
French male painters